Santenay is a commune in the Côte-d'Or department in eastern France.

Lying at the southern end of the Côte de Beaune, it is an appellation of Burgundy wine.

Population

Sights
Santenay is the location of the chateau of Philip the Bold (1342-1404), Duke of Burgundy. The chateau is open to the public and has its own wine cellars and wine tasting and sale.

Wine

Around 85% of the wine from Santenay is red wine made from Pinot noir. The wines are solid, tending more towards the rustic than the elegant, but are cheaper than the big names of the more famous Côte de Beaune villages to the north. Santenay has 124 ha of Premier Crus in its 379ha.

See also
Communes of the Côte-d'Or department
French wine
Burgundy wine
Côte de Beaune
Ensemble Santenay - an ensemble specializing in the performance of Early Music.

References

Further reading
 Coates, Clive (1997) Côte D'Or: A Celebration of the Great Wines of Burgundy Weidenfeld Nicolson

External links

 thewinedoctor.com A great overview of the geography and wines of Burgundy
 Details of the vineyards within the Côte de Beaune.
 www.netbourgogne.com
 The Burgundy Report Good descriptions of the vineyards and vintages.

Communes of Côte-d'Or